Brest-Aspe is a railway station in northwestern Germany. It is owned and operated by EVB, with regular trains on the Bremerhaven–Buxtehude railway.

Train services
The station is served by the following services:

Local services  Cuxhaven - Bremerhaven - Bremervörde - Buxtehude

References

Railway stations in Lower Saxony
Eisenbahnen und Verkehrsbetriebe Elbe-Weser